Martin Röing (born May 10, 1979) is a Swedish Bandy player who currently plays in IFK Vänersborg as a defender.  Martin was brought up by Blåsut BK. Martin has represented both the Swedish national bandy team and the 'young' Swedish side.

Martin has played for the following clubs-
 Blåsut BK
 IFK Vänersborg (1998-2006)
 Blåsut BK (2002-2003)
 Hammarby IF Bandy (2006-2007)
 Uralsky Trubnik (2007)
 IFK Vänersborg (2008-)

External links
Martin Röing  at bandysidan

Swedish bandy players
Expatriate bandy players in Russia
Living people
1979 births
IFK Vänersborg players
Hammarby IF Bandy players
Uralsky Trubnik players